Dehu Road Cantt, is a military cantonment in the city of Pune, India which was established in October 1958. The Dehu Ordnance Depot and Dehu Ammunition Depot was setup in the 1940s.

The Dehu Road Cantonment Board was established in the year 1958 and is an autonomous body controlled by the Government of India, Ministry of Defence. The Cantonment Board Dehuroad is divided into seven wards in seven villages which includes civil and military population. As of the 2011 Census, the population of Dehuroad Cantonment is 48,961 which includes military population. Elections to the Cantonment Boards are held as per the directions of, Ministry of Defence, New Delhi and as per the Cantonments Electoral Rules 2007 and not as per directions of Election Commission of Central or State Government.

Geography
It is located in the hills of the Sahyadris. It is located 25 km from Pune city on the Western side. The holy river Indrayani also passes through the limits of Cantonment Dehu Road.

Dehu Road lies 9 km northwest of Chinchwad and 27 km northwest of Pune Central along the NH4 Old Pune Mumbai Express Highway that connects it to Pune Central via Chinchwad.

The elevation keeps the climate pleasant.

It is surrounded by small towns including Dehuroad Marketyard, Poter Chawl, Parsi Chawl, Vikas Nagar, Mamurdi, Ravet, Adarsh Nagar, Bapdev Nagar, Chincholi, Indrayani Darshan, Kiwale, Sankalp Nagar, Sai Nagar, Gahunje, Barlota Nagar, Dutt Nagar, Ashok Nagar, Alkapuri, Ordnance Factory Staff Quarters, KV School Quarters, Garden City, Gandhi Nagar, Mehta Park, Sarvatra Nagar, Thomas Colony, Shitla Nagar, Sankalp Nagari, Uttam Nagar, Srinagar, Mountbatan (MB) Camp, Kinhai, Zendemala, Siddharth Nagar, and Shelarwadi. The Vikas Nagar area is one of the densest and fastest developing areas of the town. A new township is under construction at Ravet.

Economy
As Dehu Road is a cantonment town, it hosts offices of Central Government departments, especially Military and Defence. Dehu Road is close to IT parks such as Pune Hinjawadi, Talawade as well as ICC Trade Tower, and is 8 km from the Talegaon industrial zone where manufacturing industries including Ordnance Factory Dehu Road of the Ordnance Factories Board. Volkswagen, General Motors, Mercedes-Benz, BMW, JCB, Tetrapack, INA Bearings and others. are present.

Government 
The Cantonment Board consists of 07 elected members elected by the general public by General Election as per Cantonment Electoral Rules 2007 every five years. The Officer Commanding the Station is the President of Dehuroad Cantonment board which is by virtue of the position as per Cantonments Act 2006.

The constitution of Cantonment Board is as under:
President Cantonment Board
Member Secretary who is the Chief Executive Officer of the Cantonment Board
Vice President
elected members which includes Vice President also
GE MES- Technical advisor
SEMO Medical advisor
02 nominated military members nominated by President Cantonment Board
Representative of Collector
Member of Parliament,-Special invitee
Member of Legislative Assembly- special invitee
Member of RajyaSabha -special invitee
As per Cantonments Act 2006, there are two wards are reserved for ladies ( 33% reservation ) and one ward is reserved for SC/ST. As per Cantonments Act 2006, if the population of a particular Cantonment Board is more than 50,000, then there are 8 members. However, Dehuroad Cantonment Board has only seven elected members since it has less than 50000 population.

All the developmental projects to be carried out within the Cantonment area are to be sanctioned in a Cantonment Board meeting held every month in the presence of all the elected members, President, Member Secretary.

Cantonment Board Dehuroad has also constituted following sub committees as under:
Civil area committee
Finance Committee
School Committee
Hospital committee
The decisions taken by the sub committees are finally approved by the Cantonment Board meeting which is held every month. The term of Vice President is 5 years however by mutual understanding all the elected members get a chance of Vice President ship turn by turn, within the 5-year term.

Currently Ragjuvir Uddhavrao Shelar, Independent (Supported By 4 BJP & 2 CONGRESS corporators), is the vice president of DCB. The area is administered by the Dehu Road Cantonment and has got 7 Ward's;	
1: Koteshwarwadi, Ghorwadi, Shelarmala, ShelarwadiRamwadiVithBhati, MES Pump House, Ind.Darshan, Sarvatra Nagar Railway Qtrs. Amardevi Upper Nepal Line, LIG Qtrs, Shitlanagar No. 1, Thomas colony Part I, Thomas Colony near Lions Club school. Military Butcher House.
2: Mamurdi, Thomas colony, Shitalanagar No. 1, Gaikwadwasti, Marathevasti, Budhavihar, Mamurdi school near Barlota Nagar, Mehta Park, Aditya park, Indravihar, Udaygiri, Dhanalakshmi, Kohli Gas, Saudagarnagari,
3: Ganeshchawl, Main Bazar, Police line, Cantt. Hospital quarters, Mumbai Pune road, Ambedkarnagar, Gandhinagar, MasjidChawl & Indira Nagar.
4: Shitalanagar No.2, Indra villa, Guddi Apartment, Shriram Society, Saraswati Apartment, Royal Classic, Kunal Hotel, Sai Spice building, Navratan, Sankalpanagari, Shree building, Mayur Classic, Supreme, Moonrock, Royal, Unique, Kohinoor, Shivkripa, Indraprastha, Laxmipuram, Amit park, Ellora, Indrapuram, Vrindavan, MB Camp, Shrikrishnanagar, Shivajinagar, Telephone exchange, Vikrant building, Snehapreet building, Sayog building, Vaishali building, Parag building, Shashikiran building, Shweta building, Vaibhav building, Priyadarshini building, Near Shankar mandir. Dangatchawl, Mumbai Pune road & Parshichawl,
5: Main bazar, BahiratChawl, Ranadechawl, Malanivas, Rahul printers, Ginny building, Amriksingh, Omkar building, Om building, Rajdeep building, Mumbai Pune road, Trishul building, Sadguru apartment, Behind Bank of India, Tamboli Building, OFDR estates, Kendriyavidyalaya, Sidhivinayaknagari, Shrivihar, Shreenagari, Swapnanagari, Row houses, Ramkrishnavihar, Military DSC, OFDR qtrs..,
6: Chincholi Part I to Part 5, Dattanagar, Pune gate hotel, Parmar complex, Ashirwad colony, SamarthaNagari, Military Ashok Nagar
7: Zendemala, Samarth nagar, Hagawane mala, Kalokhemala, Laxminagar, Naidunagar, Kinhai, Cantonment office / qtrs., MES Qtrs, Railway qtrs., C-Type qtrs., Defence qtrs., Garden city, Kendriyavidyalaya No. 2, AlkaPuri, Military COD Road, Garden city, GE office, COD ME Line, ME line, DSC DAD 22, 72,130,213, 465,101 DAD, Unit 524 APO, 56 APO, AD regiment, 68/46 AD, Rhq / 46,

Transport
Dehu Road can be reached from Pune by road or suburban rail.

Newly constructed Flyover in Dehuroad offers convenience for travelling to Pimpri Chinchwad city.

Rail station

The station has 4 platforms and 6 lines with a connecting footbridge. The Mumbai CST - Kolhapur Sahyadri Express, Mumbai CST - Bijapur Passenger, Mumbai CST - Pandharpur Passenger, Mumbai CST - Shirdi Passenger and Pune Junction - Karjat Shuttle halt there. This station is a halt for all the Suburban trains of Pune.

Demographics
The population includes people from various states of India (mostly South Indian States). At the 2011 Census, Dehu Road had a population of 48,961. Males constituted 53% of the population and females 47%. Dehu Road had an average literacy rate of 90.96%, higher than the national average of 74.04: male literacy was 94.80% and female literacy was 86.63%, and 11.64% of the population was under 6 years of age.

Real estate
New developments include Sonigara Pearl, Celestial City, Shagun, Indra Prabha. Dehu road is becoming a popular location due to its proximity to Hinjewadi, Talegaon, Pimpri Chinchwad and Chakan Industrial areas, as well Mumbai Pune expressway. Once the Nigdi Dehu road expansion is completed Dehu Road to Pune city driving time was expected to require only 25 minutes.

Upcoming real estate residential projects near Dehu Road are Oxford Bavdhan by Shapoorji Pallonji and Joyville Hadapsar in Pune.

Religion
Dehu Road Bazaar, Murugan Temple and Subramanhya Swamy Murugan are located there. The Ayyappa temple on Sasta Hills is the biggest Ayyappa temple in Maharashtra. Maruti Mandir was established by Saint/Sant Ramdas.

Thai Poosam and Makara Jyoti festival are popular events at the Ayyappa temple. The Samadhi (cremation) of the Marathi Saint Tukaram who wrote many poems on Lord Pandharinath (Vitthal). Three Masjid and one Idgah and Idgah Masjid are present, of which Jama Masjid is the largest and oldest. Three churches are present, of which Church Mary & Emmanuel Assemblies of God Church is the oldest. Three gurudwaras are located in Dehu Road. Jee Ayanu Gurudwara is near the Market area, Indrayani Darshan is on the Old Mumbai-Pune Highway and Garden City Gurudwara is in Garden City. Vaishya Samaj mandir, Jain mandir and Shani mandir are situated at the main market. A Buddhist vihar is situated nearby. The idol in the vihar is kept by Babasaheb Ambedkar.

Durga Tekdi (a hill viewpoint and picnic spot) is 3 km southeast of Dehu Road. Appu Ghar amusement park is nearby.

Education
Dehu Road has many schools. One of the oldest and most prominent English medium schools is St Jude High School, earlier known as Garrison High School. Kendriya Vidyalaya is one of the oldest KVs in India. Shri Shivaji Vidayala, is the oldest Marathi medium school. Samson Memorial Republic School (English medium) is the oldest school in the region. It was established in 1949 by Rev K.K.Samson and by Sara Violet Samson. The school offers education to lower-income students. An Army Public School near Ashok Nagar comes under the army COD region. These schools have students from 10–15 small towns in the vicinity of Dehu Road.St. Joseph's Bethany Convent School is another Catholic school.

Sports
A new international-standard cricket stadium called Maharashtra Cricket Association Stadium at Dehu Road in Gahunje has hosted IPL matches.

References

Cities and towns in Pune district
Cantonments of India